Joseph-Pierre Borel d'Hauterive, known as Petrus Borel (26 June 1809 – 14 July 1859), was a French writer of the Romantic movement.

Born at Lyon, the twelfth of fourteen children of an ironmonger, he studied architecture in Paris but abandoned it for literature.  Nicknamed le Lycanthrope ("wolfman"), and the center of the circle of Bohemians in Paris, he was noted for extravagant and eccentric writing, foreshadowing Surrealism.  He was not commercially successful though, and eventually was found a minor civil service post by his friends, including Théophile Gautier. He's also considered as a poète maudit, like Aloysius Bertrand, or Alice de Chambrier.

Borel died at Mostaganem in Algeria.

He was the subject of a biography by Enid Starkie, Petrus Borel: The Lycanthrope (1954).

Works 
 Rhapsodies (1831)
 Champavert, contes immoraux (1833)
 Madame Putiphar (1839)

References

External links

 
 
 Text of selected Borel poems (in French)
 Text of Andreas Vesalius the Anatomist

19th-century French poets
1809 births
1859 deaths
French horror writers
French male poets
19th-century French male writers